(French for I Accuse) is an 1898 open letter by Émile Zola concerning the Dreyfus affair.

 may also refer to:

Films
 J'accuse (1919 film), a 1919 French silent film, set during World War I, directed by Abel Gance
 J'accuse! (1938 film), a remake of the 1919 film, also directed by Gance
Rembrandt's J'Accuse, 2008 Dutch, German, Finnish documentary directed by Peter Greenaway
 An Officer and a Spy (film), a 2019 film also known as J'Accuse, directed by Roman Polański

Music
 "J'accuse, a French song by Michel Sardou
J'accuse (album), 2010 album by Damien Saez, or the title song

See also
 I Accuse!, a 1958 José Ferrer film based on the Dreyfus affair
 I Accuse, a 2003 film based on the case of Canadian doctor and convicted rapist, John Schneeberger
SYR7: J'Accuse Ted Hughes, seventh release of American group Sonic Youth's SYR series
 J'accuse - The Dark Side of Nice, a 1982 pamphlet published in dual language format in English & French by the English author Graham Greene concerning government corruption in the south of France
 Léon Bloy, novelist, essayist and political activist who in 1900 wrote , "I accuse myself".
 Ich klage an, a 1941 German film commissioned as pro-euthanasia propaganda
 Jack Hues (real name Jeremy Ryder, born 1954), a British musician whose stage name was a pastiche of the name of Émile Zola's open letter about the Dreyfus affair